Devil's Gate is a 2017 American supernatural horror film written and directed by Clay Staub from a screenplay by Peter Aperlo. The film stars Amanda Schull, Shawn Ashmore, Milo Ventimiglia, Bridget Regan and Jonathan Frakes.

It had its world premiere at the Tribeca Film Festival on April 24, 2017. It was released January 5, 2018, by IFC Midnight.

Synopsis
Set in the small town of Devil's Gate, North Dakota, the film examines the disappearance of a local woman and her young son. Schull plays an FBI agent who helps the local sheriff search for answers. Partnering with a deputy, they track down the missing woman's husband and find that nothing is as it seems.

Cast
 Amanda Schull as FBI Special Agent Daria Francis
 Shawn Ashmore as Deputy Conrad "Colt" Salter
 Milo Ventimiglia as Jackson Pritchard
 Bridget Regan as Maria Pritchard
 Jonathan Frakes as Sheriff Gruenwell

Critical reception
Devil's Gate holds a 38% rating on Rotten Tomatoes, based on 16 critic reviews and hold an average rating of 5.17/10.

The Village Voice wrote, "What’s most disappointing is that Staub proves himself to be a formidable director of action and visual effects. Please, someone just give him a better story." The Hollywood Reporter, Los Angeles Times, and New York Times also panned the film.

References

External links
 
 

2017 films
2017 horror thriller films
2010s supernatural thriller films
2017 horror films
American horror thriller films
American supernatural horror films
American supernatural thriller films
2010s supernatural horror films
2010s English-language films
2010s American films